The women's kata competition in karate at the 2017 World Games took place on 25 July 2017 at the GEM Sports Complex in Wrocław, Poland.

Results

Elimination round

Group A

Group B

Finals
{{#invoke:RoundN|N4
|widescore=yes|bold_winner=high|team-width=200
|RD1=Semifinals
|3rdplace=yes

|||0||5
||{{flagIOC2athlete|Kiyou Shimizu|JPN|2017 World Games}}|5||0

|||1||4

||

References

Karate at the 2017 World Games
2017 World Games
2017 in women's karate